Flourish, Mighty Land, Op. 114, (variably called Flourish, Mighty Homeland or Prosper, Mighty Country) is a cantata written by Sergei Prokofiev in 1947, to commemorate the 30th anniversary of the October Revolution, along with his Thirty Years.

Background
In contrast to the monumental Cantata for the 20th Anniversary of the October Revolution, this cantata, in one movement, lasts for a mere 8 minutes. The short duration was obviously a disappointment for the Soviet authority, which had expected something in a grandiose manner (cf. Shostakovich's Symphony No. 9). It is scored for chorus and orchestra.

The cantata, with much first-rate music (as with his other political works), has been unjustly neglected purely for its pro-Communistic lyrics. Whether Prokofiev truly agrees with the lyrics is something we can never be sure about. However, Prokofiev was not in a position to turn down such a commission. The chorus parts, expressive and melodic, are typical of Prokofiev's warmer style.

Analysis
The cantata opens with a jaunty trumpet theme in D-flat major, spiced with the typical Prokofievian note-slips. After a repeat of the theme by muted trumpet and piccolo, strings and woodwinds continue to develop the theme.

The chorus then introduce a glowing theme a cappella, which alternates with pure orchestral sections. The climax is reached half-way, when the chorus and the orchestra perform together. Prokofiev's mastery in choral writing is demonstrated here when the female voices repeat the word 'Glory' with male voices singing the melody below.

The chorus repeats the a cappella sections again, this time interrupted by marching orchestral chords (reminiscent of the comical chords of the drunk monks in Prokofiev's opera Betrothal in a Monastery). The chorus then dies out, and the opening trumpet theme returns. The cantata ends comically with three pompous notes in descending tritones (high D-flat, G, low D-flat).

Instrumentation
Piccolo
2 Flutes
2 Oboes
English Horn
2 Clarinets
Bass Clarinet
2 Bassoons
Contrabassoon
4 Horns
3 Trumpets
3 Trombones
Tuba
Timpani
Percussion (Triangle, Tambourine, Castanets, Snare Drum, Cymbals, Bass Drum)
Harp
Piano
Strings (1st and 2nd Violins, Violas, Cellos, Double Basses)

Chorus

Premiere
12 November 1947, Moscow: Nikolai Anosov (conductor), USSR State Symphony Orchestra, Russian Federal SSR Choir.

Recordings

Cantatas by Sergei Prokofiev
1947 compositions